was the second son of King Muryeong of Baekje who settled in Japan. 

His father was born on the island of Kyushu in Japan and because of this was called Semakishi (嶋君) and King Shima (斯麻王). Prince Junda was most likely also born in Japan during the early 480s and went back to Baekje in 501 when his father returned to become the 25th King of Baekje. In 504 his father sent an envoy for a tribute to Japan named Managun but he was imprisoned by Emperor Buretsu who was angry that Baekje had not sent tribute for many years. Buretsu is known to have suffered from insanity and this is why his successor Emperor Keitai was carefully chosen from a distant branch of the Imperial Family. In the Nihon Shoki: "Seventh year, spring, second month. The Emperor made a man climb a tree, then with a bow shot him down and laughed."

The next year in 505 King Muryeong of Baekje sent his son, Prince Junda, as a hostage to Japan to repair relations with the Imperial Court. In the Nihon Shoki it is recorded as"Summer, fourth month. The King of Baekje dispatched Maagun with tribute. In a separate note, the King said, “Previously to submit tribute I dispatched Managua, who was of no relation to the royalty of Baekje. Therefore, I humbly send Saa (Junda), that he may serve in the court.” He eventually had a son, a monk named Kun. He was the ancestor of the Yamato no Kimi (Yamato clan)." His son "Kun" was born to an otherwise unknown Japanese lady and he later was renamed Hōshi no Kimi (法師君).

Descendants
His descendant Yamato no Ototsugu (和乙継) had a daughter who became named Takano no Asomi Niigasa (高野新笠) (c.720–790). She became a concubine of Emperor Kōnin and became the mother of Emperor Kanmu.

In 2001, Emperor Akihito told reporters, "I, on my part, feel a certain kinship with Korea, given the fact that it is recorded in the Chronicles of Japan that the mother of Emperor Kammu [Niigasa] was of the line of King Muryong of Baekje." It was the first time that a Japanese emperor publicly acknowledged Korean blood in the imperial line. According to the Shoku Nihongi, Niigata is a descendant of Prince Junda, son of Muryeong, who died in Japan in 513.

See also
 Tomb of King Muryeong
 Koreans in Japan
 Monarchs of Korea

References

Baekje people
Baekje Buddhists
Korean princes
Japanese people of Korean descent
Korean people of Japanese descent